Qaleh Tork or Qaleh-ye Tork or Qala Turk or Qaleh Turk may refer to:
 Qaleh Tork-e Olya
 Qaleh Tork-e Sofla